Peter Fenix (1 February 1939 – 11 January 2017) was a South African businessman and cricketer. He played 57 first-class matches for Border and Eastern Province between 1958 and 1972.

References

External links
 

1939 births
2017 deaths
South African cricketers
Border cricketers
Eastern Province cricketers
Place of birth missing
White South African people